ANASIS-II (Army Navy Air Force Satellite Information System-II), formerly called "KMilSatCom 1", is a South Korean military/government communications satellite which was launched on 20 July 2020. It was built by Airbus Defence and Space as part of an offset package into the purchase of 40 F-35 combat aircraft.

Launch
The Payload was launched aboard a reused 1st stage booster, B1058 featuring the NASA "worm" logo, which previously launched SpaceX DM-2. After stage separation it successfully landed aboard the drone ship Just Read the Instructions in the Atlantic Ocean. Both fairing halves were successfully caught by recovery ships Ms. Tree and Ms. Chief, making it the first successful catch attempt in which both halves were caught for reuse.

Operation
In October 2020, the Chosun Ilbo reported that Korean Armed Forces had not developed the ground segment of ANASIS-II yet. It is likely that ANASIS-II will not be utilized for more than a year.

See also 

 Koreasat 5 also known as ANASIS-I which is a communication satellite for military use as well as for commercial use.

References 

2020 in South Korea
Satellites orbiting Earth
Satellites of South Korea
Reconnaissance satellites
Spacecraft launched in 2020
SpaceX military payloads
Military equipment introduced in the 2020s